The following lists events in the year 1997 in China.

Incumbents
General Secretary of the Chinese Communist Party: Jiang Zemin
President: Jiang Zemin
Premier: Li Peng
Vice President: Rong Yiren 
Vice Premier: Zhu Rongji

Governors  
 Governor of Anhui Province – Hui Liangyu 
 Governor of Fujian Province – He Guoqiang 
 Governor of Gansu Province – Sun Ying then Song Zhaosu 
 Governor of Guangdong Province – Lu Ruihua 
 Governor of Guizhou Province – Wu Yixia 
 Governor of Hainan Province – Ruan Chongwu then Wang Xiaofeng 
 Governor of Hebei Province – Ye Liansong then Yue Qifeng
 Governor of Heilongjiang Province – Tian Fengshan 
 Governor of Henan Province – Ma Zhongchen then Li Keqiang 
 Governor of Hubei Province – Jiang Zhuping 
 Governor of Hunan Province – Yang Zhengwu then Chu Bo 
 Governor of Jiangsu Province – Zheng Silin then Ji Yunshi
 Governor of Jiangxi Province – Shu Shengyou 
 Governor of Jilin Province – Wang Yunkun then Hong Hu 
 Governor of Liaoning Province – Wen Shizhen 
 Governor of Qinghai Province – Tian Chengping then Bai Enpei 
 Governor of Shaanxi Province – Cheng Andong 
 Governor of Shandong Province – Li Chunting
 Governor of Shanxi Province – Sun Wensheng 
 Governor of Sichuan Province – Song Baorui 
 Governor of Yunnan Province – Li Jiating 
 Governor of Zhejiang Province – Wan Xueyuan (until April), Chai Songyue (starting April)

Events
January 21 – 1997 Jiashi earthquakes
February 3 to 5 – Ghulja Incident
February 25 – 1997 Ürümqi bus bombings
April 29 – According to Chinese government official confirmed report, two passenger train collision on Rongjiawan Station, Hunan Province, 120 persons were fatalities with 230 persons were hurt.
May 8 – China Southern Airlines Flight 3456
July 1 – Transfer of sovereignty over Hong Kong
August – Typhoon Winnie (1997)
September 19 – Election of the 15th Politburo of the Chinese Communist Party
November 8 – 1997 Manyi earthquake

Culture
1997 Shanghai International Film Festival: The Woodlanders won the award for Best Feature Film
List of Chinese films of 1997

Sport
December 5–14 – 1997 AFC Women's Championship, in Guangdong
Chinese Jia-A League 1997
China at the 1997 East Asian Games

Births
 January 22 - Fan Zhendong, Chinese professional table tennis player
 March 21 – He Bingjiao, badminton player
 November 7 - Xu Minghao, singer, member of Seventeen

Deaths

February 19 – Deng Xiaoping, in Sichuan Paramount Leader of China (born 1904)

References

 
China
Years of the 20th century in China
1990s in China
China